George Henry Perry (24 August 1920 – June 1998) was a Labour Party politician in the United Kingdom.

Perry unsuccessfully contested Harborough at the 1964 general election.

He was Member of Parliament for the marginal Nottingham South constituency from 1966 until his defeat at the 1970 general election by the Conservative Party candidate Norman Fowler, who was later a cabinet minister.

References

External links 

 All England & Wales, Death Index, 1916-2007

1920 births
1998 deaths
Labour Party (UK) MPs for English constituencies
National Union of Railwaymen-sponsored MPs
UK MPs 1966–1970